Mailrelay is a web service for email marketing and a proprietary software for sending mailings, newsletters and analysis of email campaigns.

This email marketing platform has an added advantage of being able to use most of its features on its free plan.

Features  
It was created in 2001 by the company hosting ConsultorPC as an additional service to its customers, and in 2011 began operating independently as a provider of email, offering among its features sending newsletters, filters and statistics.

Its servers are located in Europe, and it has free and paid plans.

Software version 3 was released in March 2019.

Plugins and tools

Plugins 
Extensions:

Drupal
Joomla
Magento
 Opencart
PrestaShop
Sugar CRM
 vBulletin
Wordpress
 Zen Cart

Tools 

 Application for iPhone
 Synchronization with Windows Contact

References 

Email marketing software